Robert John Blotzer (born October 22, 1958) is an American musician best known as the drummer for metal band Ratt. He attended Torrance High School in Torrance, California along with his Ratt bandmate Juan Croucier.

Ratt
Blotzer began his career playing with Don Dokken along with Juan Croucier. Blotzer and Croucier left Dokken in 1978 to form FireFoxx along with Ron Abrams on guitar. He became Ratt's drummer in 1982. Along with bassist Juan Croucier, he had previously played with noted Italian/Swiss guitarist Vic Vergeat, including a tour of the U.S. behind Vergeat's 1981 solo album Down to the Bone. Ratt had five consecutive platinum albums during the 1980s.

At the beginning of the 1990s Ratt's popularity waned, and the band called it quits in 1992. Blotzer started a more normal life outside the public eye. Five years later, Ratt reformed and toured once again. In 2000, Stephen Pearcy apparently quit the group, and shortly thereafter Bobby had exhibited an extreme dislike for Pearcy, who had sued the band for continuing under the "Ratt" name and had claimed the band had ruined their worldwide deal with Sony. Blotzer had heavily denied the claims and had said they were a bunch of "pathologic lies", adding that Pearcy was a "sick person". Blotzer and Ratt guitarist Warren DeMartini had subsequently won the court case to use the "Ratt" name.

In 2002, former Ratt guitarist Robbin Crosby died of AIDS-related complications, and heroin overdose, which marked one of the most painful parts of Blotzer's life. Blotzer posted a message to his late bandmate affectionately referred to as "The King" by fans on the group's official web site and called Crosby "one of the most kind hearted, the most compassionate, intelligent, talented" people he had ever known. 

In 2009, Metal Sludge reported that Blotzer was arrested and booked on charges of domestic violence.

In 2010, Blotzer released an autobiographical book, Tales of A Ratt – Things You Shouldn't Know. 
On September 2, 2012, it was announced Bobby would be joining Geoff Tate's touring lineup formed after the latter's dismissal from Queensrÿche, but he left on January 25, 2013, to return playing with Ratt.
In March 2015, Blotzer guested with Las Vegas band Sin City Sinners. Blotzer asked Sinners' singer Joshua Alan, guitarist Michael "Doc" Ellis, and bassist Scott Griffin to join him in forming a new version of RATT. They toured under the name "Bobby Blotzer's Ratt Experience," performing Ratt songs. 
In September 2015, Blotzer announced that he had taken control of the Ratt brand and would take his band on tour in 2016 using the Ratt name. However, within days, Warren DeMartini spoke out against Blotzer using the name, as he owns half of the Ratt name as part of WBS, Inc., the company owned by him and Blotzer. Blotzer claimed he has the legal right to go on tour using the name, as DeMartini breached his fiduciary duty by refusing to tour under the Ratt name as a partner in the corporation. In October 2015, DeMartini sued Blotzer for falsely advertising his "tribute band" as the real thing. In November 2015, DeMartini's attempt to procure an injunction to prevent Blotzer from using and touring under the Ratt trademark was overturned, allowing Blotzer to tour using the name Ratt.

Side projects
He has played with several side projects over the years, such as Twenty 4 Seven, Phucket, FireFoxx, Airborne, Angel City Outlaws, Contraband, Vic Vergat Band, and has also played as a touring drummer for Montrose. In 2008, Blotzer, Jani Lane (Warrant), Keri Kelli (Alice Cooper), and Robbie Crane (Ratt) released Saints of the Underground's debut album, Love The Sin, Hate The Sinner.

References

External links
Official website of Bobby Blotzer
Current Ratt website

1958 births
Living people
American heavy metal drummers
Glam metal musicians
Musicians from Pittsburgh
Ratt members
20th-century American drummers
American male drummers
Contraband (band) members
Torrance High School alumni